West Amana is an unincorporated community and census-designated place in Iowa County, Iowa, United States, and is part of the "seven villages" of the Amana Colonies. As of the 2010 census, the population of West Amana was 135.

Demographics

History
In 1881, West Amana had a population of 170 and contained a store.

References

Amana Colonies
Unincorporated communities in Iowa
Unincorporated communities in Iowa County, Iowa
Census-designated places in Iowa County, Iowa